Charles Jamieson may refer to:

 Charlie Jamieson (1893–1969), American baseball player
 Charles Jamieson (politician) (1888–1959), member of the Queensland Legislative Assembly
 Charles Clark Jamieson (1866–1935), United States Army general